Milluni Aymara millu light brown, reddish, fair-haired, dark chestnut, -ni suffix to indicate ownership, "the brown one") is a  mountain in the Bolivian Andes. It is situated in the Potosí Department, Cornelio Saavedra Province, Tacobamba Municipality, near the border with the Tomás Frías Province, Potosí Municipality. Milluni lies south-east of the lake Urqu Qucha.

References 

Mountains of Potosí Department